Churn is the debut album by Shihad, released in New Zealand by Wildside Records on 12 July 1993 and in Europe on 25 June 1994 on Modern Music.

Track listing
 "Factory" - 5:17
 "Screwtop" - 6:09
 "Fracture" - 5:08
 "Stations" - 4:39
 "Clapper Loader" - 3:29
 "I Only Said" - 4:00
 "Derail" - 4:46
 "Bone Orchard" - 3:25
 "The Happy Meal" - 4:30

The Japanese version included an additional track called "Prayer".

Singles chart performance

Certifications

References

1993 debut albums
Shihad albums